Calexico Mission Academy is a school under the control of the Southeastern California Conference of the Seventh-day Adventist Church. It is a part of the Seventh-day Adventist education system, the world's second largest Christian school system. It is located in Calexico, CA, United States, and has just approximately 300 students in the K-12 levels, most of whom are from the neighbouring city of Mexicali, Mexico.

Curriculum
The schools curriculum consists primarily of the standard courses taught at college preparatory schools across the world. All students are required to take classes in the core areas of English, Basic Sciences, Mathematics, a Foreign Language, and Social Sciences.

Spiritual aspects
All students take religion classes each year that they are enrolled. These classes cover topics in biblical history and Christian and denominational doctrines. Instructors in other disciplines also begin each class period with prayer or a short devotional thought, many which encourage student input. Weekly, the entire student body gathers together in the auditorium for an hour-long chapel service.
Outside the classrooms there is year-round spiritually oriented programming that relies on student involvement.

See also

 List of Seventh-day Adventist secondary schools
 Seventh-day Adventist education

References

External links
 

Schools in Imperial County, California
Calexico, California
Adventist secondary schools in the United States
Private high schools in California
Private middle schools in California
Private elementary schools in California
Educational institutions established in 1928
1928 establishments in California